Boraq  is a Syrian village located in the Subdistrict of the Hama District in the Hama Governorate. According to the Syria Central Bureau of Statistics (CBS), Boraq had a population of 315 in the 2004 census. Its inhabitants are predominantly Sunni Muslims. the village name is not eastern swiddah. Its Calle BORAQ

References

Bibliography

Populated places in Hama District